Brian Patrick Carey (born 31 May 1968) is a former Irish international footballer who played in the Football League for Leicester City as well as Wrexham, whom he also served as manager. Since his playing retirement he has worked as the Assistant Manager at Doncaster and Wolves and Chesterfield FC. He was the Lead Professional Development a Coach at Blackburn Rovers until May 2015. He is a UEFA A Licence Coach, holds a BSc in Sport Coaching and Exercise Science and he has represented Republic of Ireland at Senior International Level.

Playing career
Carey started his football career with Greenwood FC in Togher, Cork. He also played for Albert Rovers. He later signed for Cork City where he made a number of appearances in the centre of defence in a season that ended in defeat in the 1989 FAI Cup Final.

After several impressive displays, Carey signed by Sir Alex Ferguson for Manchester United on 24 August 1989 and he stayed there for four years. During his time at Manchester United, Carey joined Wrexham on loan and played in the memorable FA Cup third round tie where they knocked out reigning league champions Arsenal 2–1 at the Racecourse Ground in January 1992. In November 1993, he was transferred to Leicester City and within three years had rejoined Wrexham on a permanent deal, having played 58 times in the league for the Foxes. The highlight of his time at Filbert Street came in the 1994 Division One playoff final, when he helped them beat local rivals Derby County 2–1 and win promotion at Wembley to the Premier League after seven years away from the top flight.

His time at the Racecourse Ground spanned nine years, where he was captain and virtually an ever-present under manager Brian Flynn. Following his retirement as a player through injury in July 2005, he remained at Wrexham as a coach.

Management career
After the sacking of Wrexham manager Denis Smith in January 2007, Carey was promoted to take charge of the club on a temporary basis until the end of the season.  
At time the team were in severe danger of relegation to the Conference, but survived after 3–1 win against relegation rivals Boston United on the final day of the season.

After preserving the club's Football League status, Carey was offered the manager's role on a permanent basis, signing a two-year contract. After a poor start to the new season, however, he was replaced as manager by Brian Little, but remained on the club's staff mainly operating as a scout. Following Little's eventual departure in September 2008 soon after relegation to the Conference National, Carey and Martin Foyle briefly took over as caretaker managers.

When Dean Saunders was appointed Wrexham manager in October 2008, Carey was given the role of assistant manager. When Wrexham were top of the league Carey then followed Saunders when he moved to Doncaster Rovers of the Championship in September 2011 to again serve as his assistant manager. Here, the duo saw the club relegated to League One at the end of the season. The duo assembled their own team for the 2012–13 campaign and by January the team were top of the league.

Carey was again recruited by Saunders when he was offered the managerial job at Wolverhampton Wanderers in January 2013, but their stay with the club lasted only four months.

Carey was then appointed Professional Development Lead Phase Coach at Blackburn Rovers Academy where he worked for two years.

Carey was once again re-united with Dean Saunders after being appointed his assistant at Chesterfield in June 2015.

He now works full time in Scouting / Recruitment for a Premier League Football Club and travels throughout Europe and further afield searching for football talent.

Managerial statistics
As of 27 September 2008.

Honours
Leicester City
Football League First Division play-offs (2): 1994 1996
Wrexham
Football League Trophy (1): 2005
Individual
Denzil Haroun Reserve Team Player of the Year: 1991–92

References

External links

Living people
1968 births
Association football central defenders
Cork City F.C. players
League of Ireland players
League of Ireland XI players
Republic of Ireland association footballers
Republic of Ireland international footballers
Republic of Ireland under-21 international footballers
Republic of Ireland football managers
Manchester United F.C. players
Leicester City F.C. players
Wrexham A.F.C. players
Wrexham A.F.C. managers
Premier League players
English Football League players
Doncaster Rovers F.C. non-playing staff
Wolverhampton Wanderers F.C. non-playing staff
Blackburn Rovers F.C. non-playing staff
Association footballers from Cork (city)